Wilfred Benítez vs. Thomas Hearns, billed as The Battle of Champions, was a professional boxing match contested on December 3, 1982, for the WBC light middleweight title.

Background
A fight between Wilfred Benítez and Thomas Hearns had been in the works for over two years. In November 1980 it was announced that the two fighters had been booked for a February 1981 bout in Madison Square Garden that was going to be on a blockbuster fight card billed as "This Is It" that also featured a heavyweight fight between Ken Norton and Gerry Cooney and a light heavyweight title unification bout between WBA title holder Eddie Mustafa Muhammad and WBC champion Matthew Saad Muhammad. However the fight card was cancelled two weeks before its scheduled date when promoter Harold Smith was brought up on fraud and embezzlement charges against Wells Fargo.

Following the cancellation of the "This Is It" card, Madison Square Garden officials were still interested in including the Benítez–Hearns fight on the undercard of the rescheduled Ken Norton–Gerry Cooney fight set for May 11, 1981. Despite an offer of around $700,000, Benítez and manager Jimmy Jacobs rejected the offer in favor of a less–lucrative fight that would see Benítez moving up in weight and challenging WBC light middleweight champion Maurice Hope for his third world title. Benítez would defeat Hope to become the youngest three–division world champion in boxing history at the time. He would then make two successful title defenses against Carlos Santos and Roberto Durán before an agreement was reached in October 1982 to face Hearns on December 3rd of that year. The Benítez–Hearns fight was promoted by Don King with a co–main event featuring a super bantamweight championship fight between Wilfredo Gomez and Lupe Pintor in a fight card dubbed "The Carnival of Champions." The massive Louisiana Superdome was chosen as the site for event and it was expected to draw a crowd of 40,000. However, ticket sales fell well short of expectations and King  convinced Benítez and Hearns to take a $250,000 pay cut from their original $1.5 million purses, while Gomez and Pintor's purses of $750,000 were reduced by $125,000 in order to save the event.

The fight
The usually aggressive Hearns, who up to that point had been widely renowned for his power with 32 of his wins coming by knockout, managed to outbox Benítez, highly regarded for his defensive abilities, to score a majority decision victory. Hearns scored one knockdown in the fight, landing a right hand in the fifth that staggered Benítez, who placed both gloves on the canvas to avoid going down that constituted a knockdown. Benítez was officially credited with a knockdown in the ninth round, though replays showed that Hearns had eluded Benítez's punch and fell to canvas after Benítez had stepped on his foot A right hand injury suffered in the eighth round forced Hearns to fight using only his left hand for much of the remainder of the fight, though he was still able to win by nine points on one of the judge's scorecards (146–137) and five points on another (144–139) to earn the victory.

Fight card

References

Boxing matches
1982 in boxing
Boxing in New Orleans
1982 in sports in Louisiana
Boxing on HBO
Caesars Superdome
December 1982 sports events in the United States